William Christopher (1932–2016) was an American actor and comedian.

William Christopher may also refer to:

William R. Christopher (1924–1973), American artist and civil rights activist
William Christopher of Baden-Baden, (1628–1652), German priest and nobleman

See also
Christopher Williams (disambiguation)